The St. Aloysius Catholic Church is a Catholic parish in the Archdiocese of New York, located at 209-217 West 132nd Street between Adam Clayton Powell Jr. Boulevard and Frederick Douglass Boulevard in the Harlem neighborhood of Manhattan, New York City. 

It was built in 1902-04 and was designed by William W. Renwick – the nephew of James Renwick Jr. – in the Italian Gothic Revival style. It has been called a "little-known treasure". The church was designated a New York City Landmark on January 30, 2007.

History and description
The St. Aloysius congregation was established in 1899 and has been staffed by the Jesuit Fathers, of which Saint Aloysius Gonzaga was himself a member. The congregation was originally primarily German, Irish and Italian immigrants and their families. The current congregation is primarily African American, and gospel music is utilized in the services.

The brick church designed by Renwick has an "usually intricate facade, with colorful bands of red brick, celadon glazed bricks and polychrome terra cotta," creating "an evocative and delicate facade." Sculpted reliefs on the depict Christ, the Holy Family and two angels. The overall design compares favorably to Renwick's All Saints Church on East 129th Street, and may have been inspired by Renwick's travels in Italy before joining his uncle's firm.

Gallery

See also
List of New York City Landmarks

References 
Notes

External links

Roman Catholic churches in Manhattan
Hamilton Heights, Manhattan
Roman Catholic churches completed in 1902
School buildings completed in 1940
New York City Designated Landmarks in Manhattan
Religious organizations established in 1899
20th-century Roman Catholic church buildings in the United States
African-American Roman Catholic churches